The 1937 Chicago Cardinals season was their 18th in the league. The team improved on their previous output of 3–8–1, winning five games. Playing their first eight games on the road, they failed to qualify for the playoffs for the 12th consecutive season.

Schedule

Standings

References

1937
Chicago Cardinals
Chicago